Pasumarru is a village in Krishna district of the Indian state of Andhra Pradesh. It is located in Pamarru mandal in Gudivada revenue division.

References 

Villages in Krishna district